Paayal is a 1992 Bollywood film starring Bhagyashree along with her real life husband Himalaya Dasani. She plays a spoilt brat of a rich father.

Cast
Bhagyashree as Paayal
  Himalaya as Arjun
Farida Jalal as Shanti devi
Shakti Kapoor as Dr.Shakti Kapoor
Raju Shrestha as Kaalia
Annu Kapoor as Pardesi
Tiku Talsania as Uncle

Soundtrack

References

External links
 

1992 films
Films scored by Nadeem–Shravan
1990s Hindi-language films
Indian romance films
1990s romance films
Hindi-language romance films